1904 in philosophy

Events

Publications

Births
 January 29 – Arnold Gehlen (died 1976)
 March 20 – B. F. Skinner (died 1990)

Deaths

Philosophy
20th-century philosophy
Philosophy by year